Greater Netherlands is an irredentist concept which unites the Netherlands, Flanders, and sometimes Brussels. Additionally, a Greater Netherlands state may include the annexation of the French Westhoek, Suriname, formerly Dutch-speaking areas of Germany and France, or even the ethnically Dutch and/or Afrikaans-speaking parts of South Africa, though such variants are mostly limited to far-right groups. A related proposal is the Pan-Netherlands concept, which includes Wallonia and potentially also Luxembourg.

The Greater Netherlands concept was originally developed by Pieter Geyl, who argued that the "Dutch tribe", encompassing the Flemish and Dutch people, only separated due to the Eighty Years' War against Spain in the 16th century.

Public support for a union of Flanders and the Netherlands is relatively small, especially in Flanders, where Flemish independence is seen as the main alternative to the Belgian state.

Terminology
The potential country is also known as Dutchland (Dietsland), which incorporates the word Diets – an archaic term for (Middle) Dutch. This label was popular until the Second World War, but its associations with collaboration (especially in Flanders) meant that modern supporters generally avoid using it. The ideology is often labeled as Greater Netherlandism (Groot-Nederlandisme). Dutch Movement (Dietse Beweging) is another term often used for the movement, while in literature it is often called the Greater Netherlands Thought (Grootnederlandse Gedachte).

Greater Netherlandism is often confused with the Orangist movement in Belgium which fought for the reunification of the United Kingdom of the Netherlands after Belgian Independence. While many Orangists are Greater Netherlandists, the Orangists mainly focus on restoring Orange-Nassau's control over the South often for legitimist reasons.

The Prince's Flag is sometimes used by both Orangist and Greater Netherlandic groups, because it was flown by supporters of William I of Orange during the Eighty Years' War, who was the leader of the revolt of the Low Countries against the Spanish. During this rebellion the Dutch-speaking regions of the Low Countries, encompassing modern day Flanders and the Netherlands, banded together under the Union of Utrecht, the precursor to the modern Dutch state. The flag was also used by the Dutch Republic and United Kingdom of the Netherlands. Today the flag is generally associated with the far-right in the Netherlands.

Pan-Netherlands 

"Pan-Netherlands" is another term that was used for the theoretical Greater Netherlands state, but this term is now used mainly for the movement that aims to unite all of the Low Countries (Benelux) as a single multilingual entity, also including Wallonia, Luxembourg.

Proposals to unite Belgium and the Netherlands were done in 1789 and in the 1860s and they briefly united as the United Kingdom of the Netherlands in 1815. The movement again became relevant in the 1930s and 1940s due to Fascist Verdinaso and in the 21st century through the Benelux ideal and moderates who want to centralize this union.

History
The Greater Netherlandic movement emerged at the end of the 19th century. In Belgium, some Dutch-speaking citizens opposed the privileged position of French-speaking bourgeoisie, and the corresponding subordination of the Dutch-speaking population in government and in public life which led to the formation of a movement fighting for the rights of the Flemish population in Belgium (see Flemish Movement), in which some called for the union of Flanders and the Netherlands. 'Waar Maas en Schelde vloeien', also known as 'Het Lied der Vlamingen' is a popular Greater Netherlandic song written around this time by Peter Benoit and Emmaniel Hiel.

In 1895, Nationalists from both Belgian Flanders and the Netherlands created the Greater Netherlandic General Dutch Union or 'Algemeen-Nederlands Verbond', often shortened to ANV which sought to stimulate co-operation of the Flemish region and the Netherlands. This organisation is still active.

First World War
World War I further intensified the conflict between Dutch and French speakers in Belgium. For instance, the Flamenpolitik of the Germans, involving the administrative separation of the Dutch and the French-speaking regions of Belgium, was influenced by the Flemish Movement, which they wanted to take advantage of.

Before and after World War I, a considerable number of people started joining the ANV, both in the Netherlands and in Flanders. It also enjoyed some popularity among students, leading to the creation of the more radical Dutch Student Association (Dietsch Studentenverbond). Even the first Socialist party in Belgium, the BWP, had a considerable number of Greater Netherlandists among their ranks, mainly in Antwerp, like Maurits Naessens.

Second World War
During World War II, both Belgium and the Netherlands were occupied by Nazi Germany. It was believed in nationalist circles that a Greater Netherlands state could be created through collaboration with the German occupiers. The German Nazis however did not value this idea, and desired either a Pan-Germanist union of the ethnically Germanic Dutch speakers with Germany or a New Order in which both Belgium and the Netherlands would continue to exist as de jure independent German satellite states. And although Pieter Geyl was strongly anti-Nazi and argued from a historical and cultural perspective, Fascist and Nazi movements built upon the idea of a Greater Netherlands during the Second World War with a focus on ethnic nationalism, which is still prominent among some on the political far right.

After the war, the movement was tainted with the stigma of collaboration, notably due to the Flemish National Union (VNV) in Flanders and the National Socialist Movement in the Netherlands.

Post-World War II
While less common after the war, proponents of a Greater Netherlands do exist, mostly on the right of Flemish and Dutch politics.

The Belgian far-right party Vlaams Belang voiced support for the idea, since they see the formation of a "Federation of the Netherlands" as a logical and desirable consequence of a Flemish secession from Belgium. In 2021, the leader of the Flemish Nationalist N-VA, Bart De Wever argued in Trends Talk on Kanaal Z that the next step after Belgian Confederalism should be a union of Flanders and The Netherlands, which led to a resurgence in discussions on the topic.

In the Netherlands it is on the agenda of two major political parties, the far-right Party for Freedom (PVV) and Forum for Democracy (FvD). On 12 May 2008, Dutch politician Geert Wilders (PVV) said in De Telegraaf that he was interested in the possibility of unifying the Netherlands and Flanders. Wilders proposed that, in accordance with previous polls, referendums should be held in the Netherlands and Flanders on the merger. He argued that he was not planning to impose unification on the Flemish, but stated that then-Dutch Prime Minister Jan-Peter Balkenende needed to discuss the subject with his Flemish colleagues, which Balkenende refused. Thierry Baudet of the far-right Forum for Democracy also voiced support saying he "welcomes" Flanders in their kingdom even arguing that Flanders "actually belongs to us" when asked about it at a conference.

Smaller Greater-Netherlandic groups are the Dutch political party Nederlandse Volks-Unie (NVU) and the Belgo-Dutch Voorpost.

Opinion polling
Although it hasn't been a major political issue in The Netherlands for quite some time in 2007, a poll indicated that two-thirds of the Dutch population would welcome a union with Flanders. Another poll published by RTL4 found that 77% of respondents living in the Netherlands would support a Greater Netherlands.

In Flanders, support for the idea is less clear. A 1999 study by Jaak Billiet of the Catholic University of Leuven showed that 1 to 2% of Flemish people were in favor of the idea. In non-representative opinion polls on the internet, the results vary: from 2% to 51%. While the Dutch see unification primarily as growth of the Dutch territory, the Flemish sometimes fear to be culturally assimulated by the larger and more populous Netherlands.

Although, due to the difficulties experienced in the 2007 Belgian government formation and to a lesser extend during the 2019–2020 Belgian government formation and the victory of both Flemish separatist parties; New Flemish Alliance and Vlaams Belang, in those elections, the discussion on Flanders seceding from Belgium became relevant again. Neither of the separatist parties openly supports a "Greater Netherlands" however, presidents of both parties (Tom Van Grieken and Bart De Wever) spoke out in favour of a Greater Netherlands after Flemish independence.

See also
Bakker-Schut Plan
Benelux
Burgundian Netherlands
Flemish movement
Low Countries
Orangism
Partition of Belgium
Rattachism; A similar movement in Wallonia aiming for unification with France
Seventeen Provinces
Union of Utrecht
United Kingdom of the Netherlands

References

Further reading

Ham, L.J. Voeten vegen: Eenheid en verschil in het grootnederlandse discours van De Toorts (1916-1921) (2008)

Flanders
Geography of the Netherlands
Politics of the Netherlands
Netherlands
Flemish Movement
Belgium–Netherlands relations